Richard Price (1723–1791) was a Welsh philosopher and an English Unitarian minister, credited with founding actuarial science and mentoring Mary Wollstonecraft.

Richard Price may also refer to:

Politicians
Richard Price (Brecon MP) (c.1538–c.1587), MP for Brecon, 1571
Richard Price (Wales MP), Welsh politician who sat in the House of Commons in 1653
Richard Price (Radnor MP) (1773–1861), British Member of Parliament for Radnor
Richard Price (New South Wales politician) (1864–1936), New South Wales Legislative Assembly Member, 1894–1904, 1907–1922
Richard Thelwall Price, British Member of Parliament for Beaumaris, 1754–1768
Dick Price (politician) (born 1933), American politician in Florida

Others
Dick Price (1930–1985), American founder of Esalen 
Richard Price (barrister)  (1790–1833), British antiquarian and literary editor 
Richard Price (American anthropologist) (born 1941), American ethnographic historian   
Richard H. Price (born 1943), American theoretical physicist
Rick Price (bassist) (born 1944), English bassist 
Richard Price (writer) (born 1949), American novelist and screenwriter 
Rick Price (born 1961), Australian singer-songwriter 
Richard Price (poet) (born 1966), Scottish poet
Richard Price (entrepreneur), British entrepreneur
Rick Price (golfer) (born 1968), American golfer
Dick Price (coach) (1933–2009), American football and track and field coach, college athletics administrator
Dick Price (footballer) (1891–1965), Australian rules footballer

See also
Richard Pryce (1864-1942), British author
Richard Pryse (of Gogerddan) (died 1623), Welsh MP
Pryse baronets